The Bonavista Peninsula is a large peninsula on the east coast of the island of Newfoundland in the Canadian province of Newfoundland and Labrador. It consists of 50 incorporated towns/unincorporated communities which have a population of 12,176 as of the 2016 Canadian Census. Bonavista is the largest population centre on the peninsula.

The peninsula runs 85 km northeast from a 19 km wide isthmus and measures between 15–40 km in width. It separates Bonavista Bay in the north from Trinity Bay to the south.

Geography
Starting at the Trinity Bay side it commences at the northeastern part of the bay at Shoal Harbour, immediately north of Clarenville. Continuing east the peninsula's south shore includes the communities of Trinity and Catalina, with Port Rexton in Robinhood Bay between them, ending at its easternmost tip at Cape Bonavista. The north shore of the peninsula includes the communities of Bonavista, Summerville and Musgravetown to Port Blandford.

The highways servicing the Bonavista Peninsula are Route 230 - Discovery Trail & Route 235 - Cabot Highway. Local roads include Route 232, Route 233, Route 234, Route 236, Route 237, Route 238 & Route 239. The Newfoundland Railway also had a branch built from Clarenville to Bonavista, later called the Bonavista Subdivision by CN Rail's Terra Transport division. It was abandoned in 1984, four years before the railway's mainline was abandoned across the island.

History
This peninsula contains some of the oldest settlements on the island of Newfoundland, particularly the towns of Bonavista and Trinity. Italian explorer John Cabot is reported to have landed at Cape Bonavista in 1497 claiming this part of the New World for the King of England.

Economy
The communities and towns on the Bonavista Peninsula are in a slow decline as the importance of the fishing industry decreases.  Geographically isolated from major population centres, the provincial government has been attempting to diversify the local economy; most notably in tourism where the region is blessed with spectacular landscapes adjacent to the ocean.

Incorporated Towns
The following is a list of the 9 incorporated towns on the Bonavista Peninsula by population in the 2021 Canadian Census.

Bonavista - 3,190
Trinity Bay North - 1,649
George's Brook-Milton - 719
Musgravetown - 561
Port Rexton - 361
Elliston - 315
Trinity - 76
King's Cove - 75
Keels - 46

Communities

The following is a list of the 41 unincorporated communities on the Bonavista Peninsula by population in the 2021 Canadian Census.
Bloomfield - 431
Bunyan's Cove - 330
Canning's Cove - 157
Dunfield - 120
Burgoynes Cove - 114
Newman's Cove - 111
Spillars Cove - 80
Trinity East - 79
Upper Amherst Cove - 58
Duntara - 36
Birchy Cove - 25
Middle Amherst Cove
Lower Amherst Cove
Hodderville
Knight's Cove
Stock Cove
Open Hall
Red Cliffe
Tickle Cove
Plate Cove East
Plate Cove West
Summerville
Princeton
Southern Bay
Charleston
Sweet Bay
English Harbour
Champney's
Champney's West
Trouty
Old Bonaventure
New Bonaventure
Lethbridge
Portland
Jamestown
Winter Brook
Brooklyn
Morleys Siding
Harcourt
Monroe
Waterville

See also

List of communities in Newfoundland and Labrador
Bonavista Archives
Cape Bonavista Light
The Ryan Premises
The Matthew Replica

References

Peninsulas of Newfoundland and Labrador